Mario Michele Giarrusso (born 25 February 1965) was an Italian Senator. He is a member of the Italexit party, after being expelled from the Five Star Movement. He represents Sicily.

References 

Living people
1965 births
Italian eurosceptics
Five Star Movement politicians
Italexit politicians
Senators of Legislature XVII of Italy
Senators of Legislature XVIII of Italy
Politicians affected by a party expulsion process